Murray Henderson (born 15 June 1980 in Lanark) is a Scottish right sided defender. His most recent club was Clyde, who he left in December 2010 in order to take up a role based in Dubai as part of his full-time job.

Career
Henderson's previous clubs include Balmore and Stranraer. He impressed manager Ian McCall when playing and scoring for Stranraer versus Dundee United and again in the encounters with his former side Stranraer, which he captained.

After a long spell on the sidelines at Queens with an ankle injury, he struggled to break into the first team and was released at the end of season 2006–2007. He signed for Ayr United, following Queen of the South and Stranraer teammate Barry John Corr. Henderson signed for Clyde in May 2010.

References

External links

Scottish footballers
1980 births
Living people
Stranraer F.C. players
Queen of the South F.C. players
Ayr United F.C. players
Clyde F.C. players
Scottish Football League players
Sportspeople from Lanark
Association football defenders
Place of birth missing (living people)
Arthurlie F.C. players
Footballers from South Lanarkshire